Leonore Krenzlin (born 1934, in Leipzig, Germany) studied at the Humboldt University of Berlin beginning in 1953. From 1970 to 1990 she was a research assistant at the Central Institute of Literary History of the Academy of Sciences of the German Democratic Republic. In 1978, she completed her Doctorate of Philosophy in German Studies with a dissertation on Hermann Kant and has become an expert on German literary figures. Her work on Kant was first published in 1980 and has since been republished three times.  Among other literary figures, Krenzlin has written about Friedrich Griese, Willy Sachse and Ernst Wiechert, as well as the migration issues which occurred in 1945.

Since 1979, she has been married to the fellow German scholar, Dieter Schiller.

Selected works

References

External links 
 publications listing (in German)

1934 births
Living people
German women academics
Writers from Leipzig